Clyde is a locality of Sydney, in the state of New South Wales, Australia. Clyde is located 21 kilometres west of the Sydney central business district in the local government area of the City of Parramatta. Clyde is part of the Greater Western Sydney region.

History
Clyde is named for the River Clyde in Scotland and was thought to be a suitable name because a subdivision of land made in 1878 here was called New Glasgow.

Rosehill Junction was the name of the railway station that opened here in 1882, just west of the bridge over the Duck River . It was a junction for the Western railway line with the Carlingford railway line and Sandown railway line. The Commissioner of Railways Edward Miller Grant Eddy renamed the station Clyde Junction, before settling upon the name Clyde in 1883 saying: New Glasgow is close by and as old Glasgow is watered by the Clyde, to which Duck River has been likened, perhaps Clyde would not be unacceptable. The station became Clyde Junction in 1901 but reverted to Clyde in April 1904.

Commercial area
Clyde is exclusively an industrial and commercial area, featuring factories, workshops and warehouses. Clyde has no permanent population.

Transport
Clyde railway station used to be a junction for the Western and Inner West & Leppington lines with the Carlingford line, of the Sydney Trains network before the Carlingford line closed in January 2020.

Population 
At the 2021 Australian census there were nine people living in Clyde.

See also
Leightonfield

References
The Book of Sydney Suburbs, Compiled by Frances Pollen, Angus & Robertson Publishers, 1990, Published in Australia 

Suburbs of Sydney
City of Parramatta
Sydney localities